Graeme Barry Lee (born 31 May 1978) is an English professional football manager and former player who played as a defender.

He has previously played for Hartlepool United, Sheffield Wednesday, Doncaster Rovers, Bradford City, Darlington and also had loan spells with Hartlepool and Shrewsbury Town. Lee has won the Football League Trophy with Doncaster Rovers, and helped both Hartlepool United and Sheffield Wednesday to promotion in the mid-2000s.

Playing career

Hartlepool United
Born in Middlesbrough, North Yorkshire, Lee started his career at Hartlepool United. At the age of 17, Lee made his first team debut for Hartlepool as a substitute in a 5–0 defeat to Arsenal in the League Cup. He formed a strong partnership with Chris Westwood as Pools reached the play-offs for three consecutive seasons. In 2001–02, Lee won the Player of the Year award. He was a member of Hartlepool's successful 2002–03 season which saw promotion to the Second Division, narrowly missing out on the League championship. Overall, he made almost 300 appearances at centre back and also as a striker for Hartlepool, scoring twenty goals for the club.

Sheffield Wednesday
In 2003, he was snapped up by former boss Chris Turner for Sheffield Wednesday. He made 67 appearances for Wednesday and scored five goals in his first season and took up the captain's arm band when Dean Smith was injured, this made him a shining light in one of the Owl's worst ever seasons which led to him picking up a fans' player of the season award. Lee started the 2004–05 season in the same vein as he ended the last. Although dogged by injuries at the tail end of the season he was voted defender of the year by fans of the club.

Doncaster Rovers
Lee was deemed as not good enough for the Championship following the side's promotion by Paul Sturrock and signed for Doncaster Rovers from Sheffield Wednesday for £50,000 in 2005. He was Rovers' captain. He scored the winning goal in their 3–2 win over Bristol Rovers in the 2007 Football League Trophy final at Cardiff's Millennium Stadium.

At the start of the 2007–08 season, he was ruled out for six weeks with a neck problem, and when he returned he was sidelined for another four months because of a fractured knee. Instead on 14 February 2008, Lee signed for former club Hartlepool United on loan for one-month. Following his return to the Keepmoat Stadium, Lee was loaned out again, this time to Shrewsbury Town until the end of the season. He was recalled with two games remaining, after a series of injuries had left Rovers short of defensive cover. In June 2008, after a season in which he was limited to a couple of substitute performances, Lee was released by Doncaster Rovers.

Bradford City
On 30 June 2008, he signed a two-year deal with League Two side Bradford City. On 6 August 2008, Lee was made Bradford City club captain for the 2008–09 season, taking over from David Wetherall, who had retired at the end of the previous season. At the same time, he said it was his goal to lift the league title. He was one of four Bradford players to make his debut on the opening day of the 2008–09 season against Notts County, which Bradford won 2–1. His first goal for the club came in a 3–1 victory at Grimsby Town on 24 October 2008, having played in all City's opening 13 league games of the season. Two weeks later he added a second goal, helping City to upset League One-side Milton Keynes Dons 2–1 in the FA Cup. He played in the club's first 34 league and cup games of the season, before he missed his first game in February because of suspension from picking up five bookings.

Notts County
Lee signed a two-year deal for Notts County joining on a free transfer on 30 June 2009
just prior to the infamous takeover of the club by Munto Finance.
Lee played an important role as County were promoted as Champions of League Two in 2010 under Ian McParland, Sven-Göran Eriksson, Hans Backe, Dave Kevan and Steve Cotterill. He started the 2010–11 season as first choice centre back for yet another new County manager Craig Short but he would not be part of next manager Paul Ince's plans and was made a free agent in December 2010 bringing to an end a memorable 18 months at the club.

Darlington
Lee then signed for Darlington on a one-year deal on 30 June 2011. Darlington suffered financial difficulties during Lee's time at the club and his contract was terminated on 16 January 2012, along with the rest of the playing squad and caretaker manager Craig Liddle.

However, despite the ongoing financial and contractual issues at Darlington, Lee continued to play on until a knee injury ruled him out for the remainder of the season.

Lee joined Celtic Nation during the 2012–13 close season break.

Coaching career
In June 2019, Lee was appointed as Middlesbrough U23 head coach. 

On 1 December 2021, he left his role at Middlesbrough to take over as manager at League Two side Hartlepool United. On 5 May 2022, with one game left in the season, Lee was sacked as manager of Hartlepool. During his five–month spell as manager, Lee led the team to the semi-finals of the EFL Trophy losing on penalties to eventual trophy winners Rotherham United and the fourth round of the FA Cup losing away to Premier League side Crystal Palace. However, it was the downturn in form following the defeat to Rotherham that was citing in Lee losing his job with the club only winning once out of their previous eleven games.

Honours
Hartlepool United
Third Division runner-up: 2002–03

Sheffield Wednesday
League One play-offs: 2005

Doncaster Rovers
League One play-offs: 2008
Football League Trophy: 2006–07

Notts County
League Two: 2009–10

Individual
PFA Team of the Year: 2002–03 Third Division
Hartlepool United Player of the Year: 2001–02

Managerial statistics

References

External links

1978 births
Living people
Footballers from Middlesbrough
English footballers
Association football defenders
Hartlepool United F.C. players
Sheffield Wednesday F.C. players
Doncaster Rovers F.C. players
Shrewsbury Town F.C. players
Bradford City A.F.C. players
Notts County F.C. players
Darlington F.C. players
English Football League players
National League (English football) players
Celtic Nation F.C. players
English Football League managers
Hartlepool United F.C. managers
English football managers